Mirikənd (also, Merikend and Mirikend) is a village and municipality in the Shamakhi Rayon of Azerbaijan.  It has a population of 1,277. The municipality consists of the villages of Mirikənd and Məlcək.

References 

Populated places in Shamakhi District